George Wilfred Nevinson (3 October 1882 – 13 March 1963) was a British water polo player who competed in the 1908 Summer Olympics. He was part of the British team, which was able to win the gold medal.

See also
 Great Britain men's Olympic water polo team records and statistics
 List of Olympic champions in men's water polo
 List of Olympic medalists in water polo (men)

References

External links
 

1882 births
1963 deaths
British male water polo players
Water polo players at the 1908 Summer Olympics
Olympic water polo players of Great Britain
English Olympic medallists
Olympic gold medallists for Great Britain
Olympic medalists in water polo
Medalists at the 1908 Summer Olympics